Indoor Meeting Karlsruhe, formerly known as BW-Bank Meeting, is an annual indoor track and field competition which takes place in January or February in Karlsruhe, Germany. The meeting was first held at the Europahalle in 1985 and is currently a World Athletics Indoor Tour Gold-level event, the highest level of one-day indoor meeting in the World Athletics calendar. The athletics meeting is known for having strong fields in the short sprint events. The 2016 edition was part of the inaugural IAAF World Indoor Tour.

The meeting has a strong tradition in the 60 metres hurdles event – Susanna Kallur set a women's world record in 2008, while Liu Xiang and Márcio de Souza have set continental records on the men's side.

It was previously known as the LBBW Meeting, changing to BW-Bank Meeting in 2006.

A strict limit of 199 occupants following safety concerns after modified fire safety regulations in Germany required in 2015 that the meeting was moved to Dm-Arena in Rheinstetten on Karlsruhe's exhibition areal. The sport infrastructure is temporary, it was first used in the 2013 European Athletics Indoor Championships in Gothenburg and was acquired by the city of Karlsruhe with the intention to be able to host various more high-profile athletics events in Dm-Arena than would be possible in Europahalle even if it is put back in normal operation.

World records
Over the course of its history, three world records have been set at the Indoor Meeting Karlsruhe.

Meeting records

Men

Women

References

External links

 Official website
 Meeting Records - Men
 Meeting Records - Women

IAAF Indoor Permit Meetings
Athletics competitions in Germany
Sport in Karlsruhe
World Athletics Indoor Tour